Benjamin Diehl, also known as Ben Billions, is an American songwriter, producer, and audio engineer, best known for his production, songwriting and mixing/engineering work with DJ Khaled and Yo Gotti, as well as The Weeknd. His most notable hits include "Might Not", "What Lovers Do", "Often", "Low Life", "6 Inch", "Acquainted" and "Down in the DM". Originally an audio engineering intern at Miami's Circle House Studios while attending Full Sail University's Recording Arts program ('04) and Entertainment Business bachelor’s program ('05), Diehl built a relationship with frequent studio visitor DJ Khaled, eventually becoming Khaled's engineer. He has subsequently also written and produced for Rick Ross, Beyoncé, Kodak Black, and Nicki Minaj, among others.

Songwriting and production credits
Credits are courtesy of Discogs, Tidal, Apple Music, and AllMusic.

Audio engineering and mixing credits

Awards and nominations

References 

Living people
Record producers from Delaware
People from Rehoboth Beach, Delaware
Full Sail University alumni
American hip hop record producers
Year of birth missing (living people)